Motel Beds are an indie rock band from Dayton, Ohio.

History
The band was initially formed in the early 2000s by singer P.J. Paslosky, guitarist Tommy Cooper and drummer Ian Kaplan. The band went on hiatus soon after but reformed in 2008.

Their first release with Misra Records was These Are the Days Gone By, a collection of previously released tracks which were remastered by Carl Saff along with two unreleased tracks. The album features "Tropics of the Sand" with Kelley Deal of The Breeders and a cover of Matthew Sweet's "I've Been Waiting".

After leaving Misra, they recorded Mind Glitter for Anyway Records and album PopMatters called "their best album to date."

Band members
PJ Paslosky (vocals)
Tommy Cooper (guitar)
Derl Robbins (guitar)
Tod Weidner (bass)
Ian Kaplan (drums)

Discography
Splits and Compilations
Motel Beds/Nate Farley & The Firewatchers (2016) Record Store Day release

EPs
Hasta Mañana EP (2004)
Go for a Dive (2009)

Full-length LPs
Moondazed (2010)
Feelings (2010)
Sunfried Dreams (2011)
Tango Boys (2011)
Dumb Gold (2012)
 These Are the Days Gone By (2014) Misra Records
Mind Glitter (2015) Anyway Records

References

External links
Motel Beds at Bandcamp
Motel Beds at Facebook

Musical quartets
Musical groups from Dayton, Ohio
Misra Records artists
Anyway Records artists
American indie rock groups